In the Mirror may refer to:

Film and television
 In the Mirror of Maya Deren (In German, Im Spiegel der Maya Deren), 2001 film about avant garde filmmaker Maya Deren (1917-1961) by Austrian film maker Martina Kudláček

Music
In the Mirror (album), 1997 Yanni compilation album
"In the Mirror" (song), song from the soundtrack of the 2020 film Eurovision Song Contest: The Story of Fire Saga as performed by Demi Lovato
"In the Mirror", a track from the Australian band The Saints from their 1981 album The Monkey Puzzle